Eccles (ward) is an electoral ward of Salford, England. It is represented in Westminster by Rebecca Long-Bailey MP for Salford and Eccles. A profile of the ward conducted by Salford City Council in 2014 recorded a population of 11,499.

Councillors 
The ward is represented by three councillors: Sharmina August (Lab), Mike McCusker (Lab), and Nathaniel Tetteh (Lab).

 indicates seat up for re-election.
 indicates seat won in by-election.

Elections in 2010s

May 2019

By-election 27 September 2018

May 2018

May 2016

May 2015

May 2014

May 2012

By-election 20 October 2011

May 2011

May 2010

Elections in 2000s

References 

Salford City Council Wards